Syzygium occidentale is a species of plant in the family Myrtaceae. It is native to Karnataka and Kerala in India.

References

occidentale
Flora of Karnataka
Flora of Kerala
Vulnerable plants
Taxonomy articles created by Polbot